Treadaway is a surname. Notable people with the surname include:

 John Treadaway (1914–1993), British boxer
 Harry Treadaway (born 1984) British stage, film and television actor
 Luke Treadaway (born 1984), British stage, film and television actor
 Ray Treadaway (1907–1935), American Baseball player

See also
 Treadway (surname)
 Tredway, a surname